Railbit is a common blend of bitumen and diluent used for rail transport. Railbit which contains approximately 17% diluents or less. compared to 30% in dilbit. Dilbit can be transported through pipelines but railbit cannot. To prevent solidifying in lower temperatures, both raw bitumen and railbit require insulated rail cars with steam-heated coils. Because it has a smaller percentage of diluents, railbit crude requires special capacity rail unload terminals capable of loading railbit and of handling larger unit trains. By the fall 2013 approximately 25% had that capacity. The U.S. State Department in their 2014 Final Supplemental Environmental Impact Statement (SEIS)  regarding the proposed extension to the Keystone Pipeline, acknowledged that,

Crude oil by rail  
Although dilbit has been transported by rail since at least 1998, however, the trend in Canada to transport crude oil by rail was slower than in the United States. According to Statistics Canada there were 60 percent more rail cars transporting crude oil in Canada from February 2012 to February 2013. The destination of approximately 48 percent of the crude oil was exported to the Gulf Coast of the United States; 43 percent went to PADD I and the rest to PADD II and PADD V.

Railbit tank cars  

Sandy Fielden explained the economics behind railbit, dilbit and raw bitumen.

Western Canadian crude oil supply 

In their June 2013 report, the Canadian Association of Petroleum Producers (CAPP) categorized "the various crude oil types that comprise western Canadian crude oil supply:

Various crude oil types 
 Conventional Light 
 Conventional Heavy
 Upgraded Light
 Oil Sands Heavy, for example, (Western Canadian Select)
 
Oil Sands Heavy

"Oil Sands Heavy includes some volumes of upgraded heavy sour crude oil and bitumen blended with diluent or upgraded crude oil." 
 upgraded heavy sour crude oil 
 bitumen diluted with upgraded light crude oil (also known as "SynBit") synthetic crude oil (SCO)
 bitumen diluted with condensate (also known as "DilBit"). "Blending for DilBit differs by project but requires approximately a 70:30 bitumen to condensate ratio while the blending ratio for SynBit is approximately 50:50." 
 Railbit "Bitumen volumes transported by rail are currently relatively minor; however, these volumes would require less diluent for blending versus moving by pipeline or may even be transported as raw bitumen."

Condensate is a "mixture of mainly pentanes and heavier hydrocarbons. It may be gaseous in its reservoir state but is liquid at the conditions under which its volumes is measured or estimated."

This was sent to Copyright examinations on December 19, 2016:
Devon Canada Corporation, Devon's Canadian operations, which was established on January 1, 1982, are conducted by Devon Energy's wholly owned subsidiary
which is headquartered in downtown Calgary, Alberta.

Notes

References 

Proposed energy projects
Petroleum geology
Unconventional oil
Athabasca oil sands
Bituminous sands
Petroleum industry
Economy of Canada
Proposed energy infrastructure in Canada